The governor of New Jersey is the head of government of New Jersey. The office of governor is an elected position with a four-year term. There is a two consecutive term term limit, with no limitation on non-consecutive terms. The official residence of the governor is Drumthwacket, a mansion located in Princeton, New Jersey. The governor’s office is located inside of the New Jersey State House in Trenton, making New Jersey notable as the executive’s office is located in the same building as the legislature. New Jersey is also notable for being one of the few states in which the governor’s official residence is not located in the state capital. 

The first and longest-serving governor of New Jersey was William Livingston, who served from August 31, 1776, to July 25, 1790. A. Harry Moore remains the longest-serving popularly elected governor. The current and 56th governor is Phil Murphy, a Democrat who assumed office on January 16, 2018.

Role
The governor is directly elected by the voters to become the political and ceremonial head of the state. The governor performs the executive functions of the state, and is not directly subordinate to the federal authorities. The governor assumes additional roles, such as being the commander-in-chief of the New Jersey National Guard forces (when they are not federalized).

Unlike many other states that have elections for some cabinet-level positions, under the New Jersey Constitution the governor and lieutenant governor are the only officials elected on a statewide basis. Much like the president of the United States, the governor appoints the entire cabinet, subject to confirmation by the New Jersey Senate. More importantly, under the New Jersey constitution, the governor appoints all superior court judges and county prosecutors, although this is done with strong consideration of the preferences of the individual state senators who represent the district where vacancies arise. The governor is also responsible for appointing two constitutionally created officers, the New Jersey attorney general and the secretary of state of New Jersey, with the approval of the Senate.

As amended in January 2002, state law allows for a maximum salary of $175,000. Phil Murphy has stated that he will accept the full salary. Jon Corzine accepted a token salary of $1 per year as governor. Previous governor Jim McGreevey received an annual salary of $157,000, a reduction of 10% of the maximum allowed, while Chris Christie, Murphy's immediate predecessor, accepted the full gubernatorial salary.

The governor has a full-time protective security detail from the Executive Protection Unit of the New Jersey State Police while in office. A former governor is entitled to a one-person security detail from the New Jersey State Police, for up to six months after leaving office.

Lieutenant governor

On Tuesday, November 8, 2005, the voters passed an amendment to the New Jersey State Constitution that created the position of Lieutenant Governor of New Jersey, effective with the 2009 elections. Before this amendment was passed, the president of the New Jersey Senate would have become governor or acting governor in case the office of governor became vacant. This dual position was more powerful than that of an elected governor, as the individual would have had a major role in legislative and executive processes. As a result of the constitutional amendment passed in 2005, Governor Richard Codey, serving from November 2004 to January 2006 as governor, was the final person to wield such power.

Kim Guadagno, a former prosecutor, was sworn in as New Jersey's first lieutenant governor on January 19, 2010 under Governor Christie. Succeeding Guadagno, former assemblywoman Sheila Oliver was sworn in on January 16, 2018 under Governor Murphy.

Center on the American Governor
The Center on the American Governor, at Rutgers' Eagleton Institute of Politics, was established in 2006 to study the governors of New Jersey and, to a lesser degree, the governors of other states. Currently, the program features extensive archives of documents and pictures from the Byrne and Kean administrations, video interviews with many members of the respective administrations, some information on other American governors, and news updates on current governors (of all 50 states). The project is in the process of creating new archives, similar to the Byrne and Kean archives, for later administrations.

Oath of office
"I, [name of governor], elected governor of the state of New Jersey, do solemnly promise and swear that I will diligently, faithfully and to the best of my knowledge, execute the said office in conformity with the powers delegated to me; and that I will to the utmost of my skill and ability, promote the peace and prosperity and maintain the lawful rights of the said state. So help me God."

See also
Governorship of Phil Murphy
List of colonial governors of New Jersey
List of governors of New Jersey (1776-present)

References

External links

Executive Orders issued by the New Jersey Governor

|-

|-

Governor